Névez is a commune in the Finistère department of Brittany in north-western France.

Nevez means "new" in Breton. The name is thought to have arisen when Trégunc was split in two, creating a new parish.

Population
Inhabitants of Névez are called in French Névéziens.

Map

Notable people
Marie Pommepuy (b. 1978), illustrator and half of the joint pen name Kerascoët, grew up in Névez

Gallery

See also
Communes of the Finistère department
Entry on sculptor of Névez war memorial Jean Joncourt

References

External links

Official website 

Mayors of Finistère Association 

Communes of Finistère